Mannad Zeid (1 October 1989, Alexandria) is an Egyptian fencer. At the 2012 Summer Olympics, he competed in the men's sabre, but was defeated in the first round.  He qualified for the Olympics by winning the African Championships.

References

Egyptian male sabre fencers
Living people
Olympic fencers of Egypt
Fencers at the 2012 Summer Olympics
1989 births
Sportspeople from Alexandria